John Joseph Fox (February 7, 1859 in Roxbury, Massachusetts – April 16, 1893 in Boston, Massachusetts), was a professional baseball player who played pitcher in the Major Leagues from 1881 to 1886. He played for the Boston Red Caps, Baltimore Orioles, Pittsburgh Alleghenys, and Washington Nationals.

External links

1859 births
1893 deaths
Major League Baseball pitchers
Baltimore Orioles (AA) players
Pittsburgh Alleghenys players
Washington Nationals (1886–1889) players
Boston Red Caps players
19th-century baseball players
Newburyport Clamdiggers players
Biddeford (minor league baseball) players
Waterbury (minor league baseball) players
Baseball players from Massachusetts